Phricodoceratidae is a family in the Eoderoceratoidea, aberrant ammonites from the Lower Jurassic characterized by a large adult size and a marked change of shell form and ornament with growth. Shells are stoutly ribbed, early growth stage is round-whorled with spines, followed by a high-whorled late growth stage with smooth, modified ribbing.

Three genera are currently placed in the Phricodoceratidae: Phricodoceras, Epideroceras, and Pseuduptonia.

References
Arkell et al., 1957. Mesozoic Ammonoidea, in Treatise on Invertebrate Paleontology, (Part L); Geological Soc. of America and University of Kansas press.
Donovan, Callomon, and Howarth 1981 Classification of the Jurassic Ammonitina; Systematics Association. 

Ammonitida families
Eoderoceratoidea
Jurassic ammonites
Pliensbachian first appearances
Early Jurassic extinctions